Zhong Qianxin (born 8 May 1990) is a Chinese badminton player.

Career 
Zhong Qianxin won the girls' doubles event at the 2007 BWF World Junior Championships at Waitakere City, New Zealand with Xie Jing. They also won the 2008 Asian Junior Badminton Championships. She won her first Grand Prix event at the 2010 Vietnam Open with Ma Jin. Her first major title she won at the 2011 Yonex Open Japan Super Series with Bao Yixin, followed by a final at the 2011 Indonesia Grand Prix Gold.

One year later, Zhong Qianxin and Bao Yixin won the 2012 Singapore  and the China Masters Super Series back to back. They also reached the final of the 2012 Swiss Open Grand Prix Gold losing to compatriots Tang Jinhua and Xia Huan and the final of the 2012 India Open Super Series losing to the Korean pair of Jung Kyung-eun and Kim Ha-na. Zhong and Bao reached the number 2 on the BWF World Ranking for women's doubles in January 2013. They won the final of the 2013 U.S. Open Grand Prix Gold, but lost the final of the 2013 China Open Super Series Premier at home to compatriots Wang Xiaoli and Yu Yang.

Achievements

Asian Championships 
Women's doubles

BWF World Junior Championships 
Girls' doubles

Asian Junior Championships 
Girls' doubles

BWF Superseries 
The BWF Superseries, which was launched on 14 December 2006 and implemented in 2007, is a series of elite badminton tournaments, sanctioned by the Badminton World Federation (BWF). BWF Superseries levels are Superseries and Superseries Premier. A season of Superseries consists of twelve tournaments around the world that have been introduced since 2011. Successful players are invited to the Superseries Finals, which are held at the end of each year.

Women's doubles

  BWF Superseries Finals tournament
  BWF Superseries Premier tournament
  BWF Superseries tournament

BWF Grand Prix 
The BWF Grand Prix had two levels, the BWF Grand Prix and Grand Prix Gold. It was a series of badminton tournaments sanctioned by the Badminton World Federation (BWF) which was held from 2007 to 2017.

Women's doubles

  BWF Grand Prix Gold tournament
  BWF Grand Prix tournament

References 

Living people
1990 births
Badminton players from Guangzhou
Sportspeople from Guangdong
Chinese female badminton players